is a former Japanese football player.

Playing career
Shiokawa was born in Shizuoka Prefecture on December 17, 1977. After graduating from Shizuoka Gakuen High School, he joined Japan Football League club Montedio Yamagata in 1996. He played many matches as forward from first season. In 1999, he moved to newly was promoted to J2 League club, Oita Trinita. He became a regular player as right wing. In 2000, he moved to J1 League club Kawasaki Frontale. Although he could hardly play in the match in 2000 and the club was relegated to J2 from 2001, he became a regular player as left side midfielder from 2001. However his opportunity to play decreased behind Augusto from 2003. Although the club won the champions in 2004 and was promoted to J1 from 2005, he could hardly play in the match and he left the club end of 2004 season. In 2005, he moved to J1 club Yokohama F. Marinos. However he could hardly play in the match. In May 2007, he moved to J2 club Tokushima Vortis. He played many matches as regular player in 2007. However his opportunity to play decreased in 2008 and he retired end of 2008 season.

Club statistics

J.League Firsts
 Appearance: March 14, 1999. Oita Trinita 1 v 0 Consadole Sapporo, Oita Stadium
 Goal: March 21, 1999. Oita Trinita 1 v 0 Kawasaki Frontale, Oita Stadium

References

External links

1977 births
Living people
Association football people from Shizuoka Prefecture
Japanese footballers
J1 League players
J2 League players
Japan Football League (1992–1998) players
Montedio Yamagata players
Oita Trinita players
Kawasaki Frontale players
Yokohama F. Marinos players
Tokushima Vortis players
Association football midfielders